Regional 1 North West is a level five league in the English rugby union system, with the twelve teams drawn from across North West England. The other level five leagues are Regional 1 Midlands, Regional 1 North East, Regional 1 South Central, Regional 1 South East and Regional 1 South West.

Format
The twelve teams in this league are drawn from across North West England, with the league champions promoted to National 2 North. The league's bottom three teams are relegated to either Regional 2 North or Regional 2 North West depending on their geographic location.

The season runs from September to May and comprises twenty-four rounds of matches, with each club playing each of its rivals home and away. The results of the matches contribute points to the league table as follows:
    4 points are awarded for a win
    2 points are awarded for a draw
    0 points are awarded for a loss, however
    1 losing (bonus) point is awarded to a team that loses a match by 7 points or fewer
    1 additional (bonus) point is awarded to a team scoring 4 tries or more in a match

Current season

Participating teams and locations

References

5
Recurring sporting events established in 2022
Sports leagues established in 2022